The mixed doubles squash event at the 2019 Pan American Games will be held from July 25th – July 28th at the  CAR Voleibol en la Videna in Lima, Peru. 

Each National Olympic Committee could enter a maximum of one pair into the competition. The athletes will be drawn into an elimination stage draw. Once a pair lost a match, they will be no longer able to compete. Each match will be contested as the best of three games. This will be the first time the mixed doubles event has been contested at the Pan American Games.

Results

Bracket

References

External links
Results

Mixed doubles